Bognanco (Western Lombard: Bügnanch), population about 250, is a commune in the Province of Verbano-Cusio-Ossola in the Italian region Piedmont, located in an Alpine valley about  northeast of Turin immediately to the west of Domodossola and on the border with Switzerland.

The population is distributed between two main settlements, a number of hamlets, and various isolated dwellings: the seat of the municipality is in San Lorenzo (980 m). Fonti (669 m) was also classified as a centro abitato ("populated centre"). Less strongly defined settlements (nuclei abitati) were Graniga (1113 m), Messasca (525 m), and Pizzanco (1142 m). Localities whose population was subject to significant variation during the course of a year were Pioi (850 m), La Gomba (1251 m), and Vercengio (1299 m).  Morasco (956 m) is described as a ‘special mountain nucleus’.

References

Cities and towns in Piedmont
Spa towns in Italy